Psalm 65 is the 65th psalm of the Book of Psalms, beginning in English in the King James Version: "Praise waiteth for thee, O God, in Sion: and unto thee shall the vow be performed". In the slightly different numbering system of the Greek Septuagint version of the Bible and the Latin Vulgate, this psalm is Psalm 64. In Latin, it is known as "Te decet hymnus Deus in Sion et tibi reddetur votum in Hierusalem".

The psalm forms a regular part of Jewish, Catholic, Lutheran, Anglican and other Protestant liturgies. It has been set to music.

Background
Psalm 65 begins a group of four psalms which are hymns of thanksgiving, in contrast to preceding psalms which are laments. It begins in the style of a prayer, transitions to a description of God, and concludes with praise to God.

The Jerusalem Bible suggests it is set "after a good year with plentiful rain".

Text

Hebrew Bible version
Following is the Hebrew text of Psalm 65:

King James Version

 Praise waiteth for thee, O God, in Sion: and unto thee shall the vow be performed.
 O thou that hearest prayer, unto thee shall all flesh come.
 Iniquities prevail against me: as for our transgressions, thou shalt purge them away.
 Blessed is the man whom thou choosest, and causest to approach unto thee, that he may dwell in thy courts: we shall be satisfied with the goodness of thy house, even of thy holy temple.
 By terrible things in righteousness wilt thou answer us, O God of our salvation; who art the confidence of all the ends of the earth, and of them that are afar off upon the sea:
 Which by his strength setteth fast the mountains; being girded with power:
 Which stilleth the noise of the seas, the noise of their waves, and the tumult of the people.
 They also that dwell in the uttermost parts are afraid at thy tokens: thou makest the outgoings of the morning and evening to rejoice.
 Thou visitest the earth, and waterest it: thou greatly enrichest it with the river of God, which is full of water: thou preparest them corn, when thou hast so provided for it.
 Thou waterest the ridges thereof abundantly: thou settlest the furrows thereof: thou makest it soft with showers: thou blessest the springing thereof.
 Thou crownest the year with thy goodness; and thy paths drop fatness.
 They drop upon the pastures of the wilderness: and the little hills rejoice on every side.
 The pastures are clothed with flocks; the valleys also are covered over with corn; they shout for joy, they also sing.

Verse 1
Praise is awaiting You, O God, in Zion;
And to You the vow shall be performed.
Some versions make reference to silence in this verse, for example the New American Standard Bible:
There will be silence before You, and praise in Zion, God,
And the vow will be fulfilled for You.

Uses

Judaism
This psalm is recited on Yom Kippur, and at Shmini Atzeret in some traditions.
Verse 5 is recited by those present at a brit milah.

Book of Common Prayer
In the Church of England's Book of Common Prayer, this psalm is appointed to be read on the evening of the 12th day of the month.

Music 
Heinrich Schütz set Psalm 65 in a metred version in German, "Gott, man lobt dich in der Still", SWV 162, as part of the Becker Psalter, first published in 1628.

References

Works cited

External links 

 
 
  in Hebrew and English - Mechon-mamre
 Text of Psalm 65 according to the 1928 Psalter
 For the leader. A psalm of David. A song. To you we owe our hymn of praise, O God on Zion text and footnotes, usccb.org United States Conference of Catholic Bishops
 Psalm 65 – At the Temple, In the Earth text and detailed commentary, enduringword.com
 Psalm 65:1 introduction and text, biblestudytools.com
 Psalm 65 / Refrain: Be joyful in God, all the earth. Church of England
 Psalm 65 at biblegateway.com
 Hymns for Psalm 65 hymnary.org

065
Works attributed to David